Henri Delacroix (2 December 1873, Paris – 3 December 1937, Paris) was a French psychologist, "one of the most famous and most prolific French psychologists working at the beginning of [the twentieth] century."

Born in Paris, Henri Delacroix was educated at the Lycée Henri-IV and the Sorbonne, gaining his agrégation in philosophy in 1894. After two years at the University of Berlin and the University of Heidelberg, he became a professor at the Lycée de Pau, He later became a professor and subsequently dean of the Faculty of Letters at the Sorbonne. He died in Paris.

Works
 Essai sur le mysticisme spéculatif en Allemagne au quatorzième siècle, 1899.
 Études d'histoire et de psychologie du mysticisme; les grands mystiques chrétiens, 1908.
 La psychologie de Stendhal, 1918.
 La religion et la foi, 1922.
 Le langage et la pensée, 1924.
 L'analyse psychologique de la fonction linguistique, 1926.
 Psychologie de l'art; essai sur l'activité artistique, 1927.
 Les grandes formes de la vie mentale, 1934.
 L'enfant et le langage, 1934.
 Les grands mystiques chrétiens, 1938

References

External links
 

1873 births
1937 deaths
French psychologists